This album is a 1950 recording of selections from George Gershwin's opera Porgy and Bess, sung by the noted opera stars Robert Merrill and Risë Stevens. The album featured no black singers at all, even though the opera was written for a mostly African-American cast (the whites in the opera speak, but do not sing). It was recorded by RCA Victor on September 12 and September 13, 1950. The album was originally released on one twelve-inch 33 rpm LP with the catalog number LM 1124.

Naxos Records re-released the album on CD along with the complete 1951 recording, though the Naxos CD omitted the chorus number "Gone, Gone Gone". (Naxos 8.110287-88)

Cast
Robert Merrill, baritone
Risë Stevens, mezzo-soprano
Robert Shaw Chorale
RCA Victor Orchestra
Robert Russell Bennett, conductor

Track listing

External links
Track listing and synopsis from Naxos' reissue

1950s classical albums
RCA Victor albums
Albums conducted by Robert Russell Bennett
1950 album